Agia Varvara is a village located in the Nicosia District of Cyprus. Agia is the Greek word for "Saint" .The village is named after Saint Varvara or Saint Barbara. The village is located 22 km south from Nicosia and is at an altitude of 311 meters. The village is known for its many cultivated and barren pieces of land.  The  hosts the Church of Agia Varvara, the Chapel of Agia Paraskevi, Chapel of Agios Nektarios and  the Chapel of Holy Cross.

Economy 
Residents of the village work primarily in agriculture and cultivate crops such as wheat, barley, and olives. Many residents commute to Nicosia to work as government employees, craftsmen and factory workers.

The main product of cultivation is barley. The cultivation of barley is one of the main occupations.

The systematic cultivation of yeast was recently initiated since viticulture used to be their primary occupation. However, that was unprofitable and vineyards were replaced with barley or olive trees. Many plots of land were rented to professional farmers for the cultivation of barley.

The cultivation of olive trees is limited in the village, as it mostly serves domestic needs. Many of the inhabitants produce oil for their own use.

Phytorio (nursery garden) is a small mountain, where pine trees, cypresses and brigalows were planted. This area belongs to the Forest Department. The community council plans to construct a community park next to it. This park will include a playground, a playing field and a kiosk.

During spring, blossoming almond trees add a pleasant note to the plain.

History
Earlier a village named Agios Georgeos (or Saint George) occupied this area. Around 1400 CE, the village church was burned down, leaving only the icon of Agia Varvara intact. The villagers rebuilt the Church near the previous one and dedicated it to Agia Varvara, renaming the village in the process. 

Historic caverns are found in the region, and it is believed that the larger catacombs were made by the first Christians. 

During the time of the Kingdom of Cyprus, between 1192 and 1489, it was a fief, after which it came under Turkish rule, and 15-20 Turkish families settled in the village along with residents of Nisou. Near Agia Varvara, the archeological site Alymras was discovered in 1982. The site was used for copper production, which dates to 600 BCE.

Notable people
Mihalis Violaris

References

Communities in Nicosia District